The 1987–88 Rhode Island Rams men's basketball team represented the University of Rhode Island as a member of the Atlantic 10 Conference during the 1987–88 college basketball season. The team was led by second-year head coach Tom Penders and played their home games at Keaney Gymnasium. They finished the season 28–7, 14–4 in A-10 play and lost in the championship game of the 1988 Atlantic 10 men's basketball tournament. Rhode Island was invited to the 1988 NCAA tournament as No. 11 seed in the East region and make the school's first run to the Sweet Sixteen. In the opening round, they upset No. 6 seed Missouri, and followed that by knocking off No. 3 seed Syracuse in the round of 32. In the East regional semifinal, the Rams narrowly lost to Duke, 73–72. To date, this season marks one of only two appearances by the Rams in the Sweet Sixteen of an NCAA Tournament (1998).

Roster

Schedule and results

|-
!colspan=9 style=| Regular season

|-
!colspan=9 style=| Atlantic 10 tournament

|-
!colspan=9 style=| NCAA tournament

References

Rhode Island
Rhode Island
Rhode Island Rams men's basketball seasons
Rhode
Rhode